Telenor Denmark is one of the 4 major Danish mobile telephone operators with a customer base in excess of 1.4 million customers.  Since 12 February 2004, it has been a subsidiary of the Norwegian mobile telephone company Telenor ASA. Before 15 June 2009, it was known as Sonofon. Sonofon and Cybercity merged in 2006 to form an alliance. On 15 June 2009, the two brands merged and renamed to Telenor. Since December 2014, Telenor has partnered with Swedish operator Telia to deliver a joint mobile network across Denmark.

History

Sonofon 

Sonofon was founded as a company in 1991 as a joint venture between GN Store Nord and BellSouth Corporation. On 9 September that year, Sonofon was awarded the license to operate Denmark's first GSM 900 mobile network (while the second GSM license was later awarded to Tele Danmark). Sonofon launched its services in September 1992 and saw its mobile base grow rapidly to half a million users by 1996. On 11 January 1998, Sonofon launched Denmark's first prepaid SIM cards, and in 2000 Sonofon launched GPRS on its network.

GN Store Nord sold its 53.1% stake in Sonofon for 13.1 billion DKK on 13 June 2000, and on 10 December 2003, Telenor acquired BellSouth's stake for 3.05 billion DKK.

In 2006, Cybercity initiated a tight cooperation with Sonofon, sharing headquarters on Frederikskaj in Copenhagen (where Sonofon's main administrative sections are housed), and even going as far as using Sonofon-hired and trained consultants within Sonofon's main call centre as a secondary base of customer service operations.

Tele2 
In May 2007, Telenor announced the purchase of the Danish operations of the competing ISP Tele2, with the Danish commission of monopoly approving the purchase (later the approval was announced to the press, currently the main press release).

Cybercity 

Cybercity was a name of a leading Danish internet service provider owned by Telenor. The company has its own nationwide core network, and serves both consumer and business customers. Cybercity has reported more than 186.000 DSL customers in its report for the first quarter of 2007 (Danish), with more than 380 employees.

References

External links 
 

Internet service providers of Denmark
Mobile phone companies of Denmark
Telecommunications companies of Denmark
 
Companies based in Copenhagen